The 2018–19 Princeton Tigers women's basketball team represented Princeton University during the 2018–19 NCAA Division I women's basketball season. The Tigers, led by twelfth-year head coach Courtney Banghart, played their home games at Jadwin Gymnasium as members of the Ivy League.

The Tigers finished the season with a 22–10 overall record and 12–2 in the Ivy League. They tied Penn for first place in the conference's regular season, and met them in the Ivy League Tournament championship to determine which Ivy League team will get a first-round bid for the NCAA tournament. The Tigers won, but lost in the first round to 17th-ranked Kentucky.

Previous season
The Tigers finished the 2017–18 season with a 24–6 overall record and 12–2 in the Ivy League. They finished first in the conference to play Penn in a playoff to determine which Ivy League team will get a first-round bid for the NCAA tournament. The Tigers won, but their postseason ended with a loss in the first round to 16th-ranked Maryland.

Roster

Schedule

|-
!colspan=8 style=| Regular season

|-
!colspan=8 style=| Ivy League regular season

|-
!colspan=8 style=| Ivy League Tournament

|-
!colspan=8 style=| NCAA Women's Tournament

References

Princeton
Princeton Tigers women's basketball seasons
Princeton Tigers women's
Princeton Tigers women's
Princeton